LRT may stand for:

Television and radio broadcasting
Lithuanian National Radio and Television, public broadcasting company of Lithuania 
LRT Klasika, a Lithuanian radio channel
LRT Kultūra, a Lithuanian television station
LRT Lituanica, a Lithuanian public television channel
LRT Radijas, a Lithuanian radio station
LRT, Last Retweet

Transportation
 Light rail transit, a type of higher capacity, higher speed tram (shortened to LRT in Canada)
 Light rapid transit, a type of automated rapid transit system; often called a "medium-capacity rail system" or "light metro"
 Lion Rock Tunnel, a transport tunnel part of Route 1 in Hong Kong
 London Regional Transport, the public transport network in Greater London, UK, 1984–2000
 Lorient South Brittany Airport, which has the IATA code LRT
 Louis Riel Trail, a highway in Saskatchewan, Canada
 Manila Light Rail Transit System, in Manila, Philippines

Other
Likelihood-ratio test, a method for comparing statistical models
Little Round Top, a hill at Gettysburg, Pennsylvania